In algebraic geometry, a smooth scheme over a field is a scheme which is well approximated by affine space near any point. Smoothness is one way of making precise the notion of a scheme with no singular points. A special case is the notion of a smooth variety over a field. Smooth schemes play the role in algebraic geometry of manifolds in topology.

Definition 

First, let X be an affine scheme of finite type over a field k. Equivalently, X has a closed immersion into affine space An over k for some natural number n. Then X is the closed subscheme defined by some equations g1 = 0, ..., gr = 0, where each gi is in the polynomial ring k[x1,..., xn]. The affine scheme X is smooth of dimension m over k if X has dimension at least m in a neighborhood of each point, and the matrix of derivatives (∂gi/∂xj) has rank at least n−m everywhere on X. (It follows that X has dimension equal to m in a neighborhood of each point.) Smoothness is independent of the choice of immersion of X into affine space.

The condition on the matrix of derivatives is understood to mean that the closed subset of X where all (n−m) × (n − m) minors of the matrix of derivatives are zero is the empty set. Equivalently, the ideal in the polynomial ring generated by all gi and all those minors is the whole polynomial ring.

In geometric terms, the matrix of derivatives (∂gi/∂xj) at a point p in X gives a linear map Fn → Fr, where F is the residue field of p. The kernel of this map is called the Zariski tangent space of X at p. Smoothness of X means that the dimension of the Zariski tangent space is equal to the dimension of X near each point; at a singular point, the Zariski tangent space would be bigger.

More generally, a scheme X over a field k is smooth over k if each point of X has an open neighborhood which is a smooth affine scheme of some dimension over k. In particular, a smooth scheme over k is locally of finite type.

There is a more general notion of a smooth morphism of schemes, which is roughly a morphism with smooth fibers. In particular, a scheme X is smooth over a field k if and only if the morphism X → Spec k is smooth.

Properties 
A smooth scheme over a field is regular and hence normal. In particular, a smooth scheme over a field is reduced.

Define a variety over a field k to be an integral separated scheme of finite type over k. Then any smooth separated scheme of finite type over k is a finite disjoint union of smooth varieties over k.

For a smooth variety X over the complex numbers, the space X(C) of complex points of X is a complex manifold, using the classical (Euclidean) topology. Likewise, for a smooth variety X over the real numbers, the space X(R) of real points is a real manifold, possibly empty.

For any scheme X that is locally of finite type over a field k, there is a coherent sheaf Ω1 of differentials on X. The scheme X is smooth over k if and only if Ω1 is a vector bundle of rank equal to the dimension of X near each point. In that case, Ω1 is called the cotangent bundle of X. The tangent bundle of a smooth scheme over k can be defined as the dual bundle, TX = (Ω1)*.

Smoothness is a geometric property, meaning that for any field extension E of k, a scheme X is smooth over k if and only if the scheme XE := X ×Spec k Spec E is smooth over E. For a perfect field k, a scheme X is smooth over k if and only if X is locally of finite type over k and X is regular.

Generic smoothness 
A scheme X is said to be generically smooth of dimension n over k if X contains an open dense subset that is smooth of dimension n over k. Every variety over a perfect field (in particular an algebraically closed field) is generically smooth.

Examples 
Affine space and projective space are smooth schemes over a field k.
An example of a smooth hypersurface in projective space Pn over k is the Fermat hypersurface x0d + ... + xnd = 0, for any positive integer d that is invertible in k.
An example of a singular (non-smooth) scheme over a field k is the closed subscheme x2 = 0 in the affine line A1 over k.
An example of a singular (non-smooth) variety over k is the cuspidal cubic curve x2 = y3 in the affine plane A2, which is smooth outside the origin (x,y) = (0,0).
A 0-dimensional variety X over a field k is of the form X = Spec E, where E is a finite extension field of k. The variety X is smooth over k if and only if E is a separable extension of k. Thus, if E is not separable over k, then X is a regular scheme but is not smooth over k. For example, let k be the field of rational functions Fp(t) for a prime number p, and let E = Fp(t1/p); then Spec E is a variety of dimension 0 over k which is a regular scheme, but not smooth over k.
Schubert varieties are in general not smooth.

Notes

References 
 D. Gaitsgory's notes on flatness and smoothness at http://www.math.harvard.edu/~gaitsgde/Schemes_2009/BR/SmoothMaps.pdf

See also 
Étale morphism
Dimension of an algebraic variety
Glossary of scheme theory
Smooth completion